Olga Igorevna Buzova (born 20 January 1986) is a Russian media personality and singer. Buzova is regarded as one of the most successful Russian contemporary entertainers.

Buzova is most known for appearing on Dom-2, a Russian reality TV show. As of August 2021, with over 23 million followers, she is the second most-followed Russian individual on Instagram, coming after MMA fighter Khabib Nurmagomedov who holds the record with more than 30 million followers.

Biography 

Olga Igorevna Buzova was born on 20 January 1986 in Leningrad into the family of Igor Dmitriyevich Buzov, a veteran of the Soviet Armed Forces, and Irina Aleksandrovna Buzova, a dentist. Buzova has a younger sister, Anna, as well as a grandmother who lives in Klaipėda, Lithuania.

From June 2012 to December 2016, Buzova was married to football player Dmitri Tarasov.

In 2019, she participated in the Russian version of Fort Boyard.

She was the tenth-highest Russian earner on Instagram and YouTube in 2021, with net revenue of about 3.3 million US dollars from 23.4 million subscribers.

Personal life
Buzova is a supporter of the 2022 Russian invasion of Ukraine and actively promoted the invasion on social media.

Discography

Albums 
 Под звуки поцелуев (2017)  (Sounds of Kisses) (Certifications - Russia 3×Platinum 200,000 units)
 Принимай меня (2018) (Accept Me) (Certifications - Russia 2×Platinum 100,000 units)
 Вот она я (2021) (Here I Am)

Singles
Под звуки поцелуев (2016) (Sounds of Kisses)
Привыкаю (2017) (Getting Used)
Люди не верили (2017) (People Didn't Believe)
Улететь (2017) (Fly Away)
Нам будет жарко (feat. Настя Кудри) (2017) (We Will Be Hot feat. Nastya Kudri)
Мало половин (2017) (Few Halves) (Certifications - Russia Platinum 100,000 units)
Not Enough for Me (2017)
Хит-парад (2017) (Hit Parade)
WIFI (2017)
Одна ночь (2018) (One Night)
Она не боится (2018) (She's Not Afraid)
Тоже музыка (2018) (Also Music)
Чемпион (2018) (Champion)
 Ночь текила (2018) (Tequila Night)
 Принимай меня (2018) (Accept Me)
 На Доме-2 (ЛОVА ЛОVА) (feat. Витя АК) (2017) (At House 2 (LOVA LOVA) feat. Vitya AK)
 Миром правит любовь (Love Rules The World) (2018)
 Танцуй под Бузову (Dance Under Buzova) (2018)
 Очень хорошо (Very Good) (2019)
 Поцелуй на балконе (feat. Лёша Свик) (Kiss on the balcony feat. Lesha Svik) (2019)
 Женское слово (Woman Word) (2019)
 Водица (Water) (2019)
 Лайкер (Liker) (2019)
 Вот она я (Here l Am) (2019)
 Я еще верю (I Still Believe) (2019)
 Не виновата (Not Guilty) (2019)
 Мандаринка (feat. DAVA) (2019) (Tangerine feat. DAVA)
 В огне (On Fire) (2020)
 SWIPE (2020)
 Давай останемся дома (Let's Stay Home) (2020)
 Сука весна (Bitch Spring) (2020)
 Скука весна (Boredom Spring) (2020)
 Орбит без сахара (Orbit without sugar) (2020)
 Mira me Bebe (2020)
 X.О (2020)
 Проблема (Problem) (2020)
 Ненормальный вайб (Abnormal vibe) (2020)
 Хейт (Hate) (2020)
 Снежинки (Snowflakes) (2020)
 Колбаса (Sausage) (2020)
 Розовые очки (Pink glasses) (2021)
 Грустный трек (Sad track) (2021)
 Так сильно (So strong) (2021)
 Завязывай (Finish) (2021)
 Женская доля (Female share) (2021)
 Без дел (Without affairs) (2021)
 Код любви (Love code) (2021)
 Игрушка (Toy) (2021)
 Не буди во мне зверя (Don't wake the beast in me) (2022)
 Делать добро (To do good) (2022)
 Baby Tonight (2022)
 Михаил (Mikhail) (2022)
 Антитела (Antibodies) (2022)
 Худи (Hoodie) (2022)
 Заплачу (Will Pay) (2022)

Videography

Под звуки поцелуев (2017) (Sounds of Kisses) (DJ PitkiN Remix) - Lyric Video
Привыкаю (2017) (Getting Used) - Mood Video
Привыкаю (2017) (Getting Used)
Люди не верили (2017) (People Didn't Believe)
Нам будет жарко (feat. Настя Кудри) (2017) (We Will Be Hot feat. Nastya Kudri)
Мало половин (2017) (Few Halves)
Not Enough For Me (2017) - Lyric Video
Хит-парад (2017) (Hit Parade)
Неправильная (2017) (Wrong)
WIFI (2018)
Бери меня (2018) (Take me)
Чемпион (2018) (Champion)
 Принимай меня (2018) (Accept Me)
 Губы (2018) (Lips) - Lyric Video
 Пятница (2018) (Friday) - Lyric Video
 Алкоголь (2018) (Alcohol) - Lyric Video
 АтоМы (2018) (Atoms) - Lyric Video
 Эгоистка (2018) (Selfish) - Lyric Video
 На Доме-2 (ЛОVА ЛОVА) (feat. Витя АК) (2017) (At House 2 (LOVA LOVA) feat. Vitya AK)
 Танцуй под Бузову (Dance Under Buzova) (2018)
 Эгоистка (2019) (Selfish)
 Поцелуй на балконе (feat. Лёша Свик) (Kiss on the balcony feat. Lesha Svik) (2019) - Mood Video
 Очень хорошо (Very Good) (2019)
 Водица (Water) (2019)
 Лайкер (Layker) (2019)
 Не виновата (Not  Guilty) (2019)
 Мандаринка (feat. DAVA) (2019) (Tangerine feat. DAVA) - Mood Video
 Мандаринка (feat. DAVA) (2019) (Tangerine feat. DAVA)
 В огне (On Fire) (2020) - Lyric Video
 В огне (On Fire) (2020) - Mood Video
 SWIPE (2020) - Lyric Video
 Давай останемся дома (Let's Stay Home) (2020) - Lyric Video
 Давай останемся дома (Let's Stay Home) (2020)
 Сука весна (Bitch Spring) (2020) - Mood Video
 Орбит без сахара (Orbit without sugar) (2020)
 Mira me Bebe (feat. Джаро и Ханза) (feat. Jaro and Hanza) (2020) - Lyric Video
 Mira me Bebe (feat. Джаро и Ханза) (feat. Jaro and Hanza) (2020)
 X.O. (2020) - Lyric Video
 Проблема (Problem) (2020) - Mood Video
 Проблема (Problem) (2020) - Comic Video
 Хейт (Hate) (2020) - Mood Video
 Снежинки (Snowflakes) (2020)
 Снежинки (Snowflakes) (2020) - Lyric Video
 Колбаса (Sausage) (2020)
 Розовые очки (Pink glasses) (2021) - Mood Video
 Розовые очки (Pink glasses) (2021) - Lyric Video
 Грустный трек (Sad track) (2021) - Lyric Video
 Грустный трек (Sad track) (2021) - Mood Video
 АтоМы (Atoms) (2021)
 Так сильно (So strong) (2021)
 Женская доля (Female Share) (2021) - Mood Video
 Без дел (Without Affairs) (2021)
 Код любви (Love Code) (2021) - Mood Video
 Выключим рассвет (Turn Off The Dawn) (2021) - Mood Video
 Спойлер (Spoiler) (2021) - Mood Video
 Я не знакомлюсь (I Don't Meet) (2021) - Mood Video
 Танцы на слезах (Dancing On Tears) (2021)
 Игрушка (Toy) (2021)
 Не буди во мне зверя (Don't wake the beast in me) (2022) - Mood Video
 Делать добро (To do good) (2022) - Mood Video
 Baby Tonight (2022) - Mood Video
 Михаил (Mikhail) (2022) - Mood Video
 Антитела (Antibodies) (2022) - Mood Video
 Худи (Hoodie) (2022) - Mood Video
 Заплачу (Will Pay) (2022)

Tours 
 Под звуки поцелуев (2017-2018)  (Sounds of Kisses)
 Принимай меня (2018-2021) (Accept Me)
 Вот она я (2022-2023) (Here I Am)

References

External links

  

1986 births
Living people
Russian television presenters
Russian radio presenters
Russian women radio presenters
Association footballers' wives and girlfriends
Saint Petersburg State University alumni
21st-century Russian singers
21st-century Russian women singers
Actresses from Saint Petersburg
Singers from Saint Petersburg
Russian women television presenters
Russian podcasters